Anatolie Golea (born 10 June 1965) is a journalist from the Republic of Moldova. He was a founder of INFOTAG newsagency.

Awards 
 Order of the Republic (Moldova) - highest state distinctions (2009)

References

External links 
 Oamenii de vază ai raionului Ocniţa

Living people
Moldovan journalists
Male journalists
People from Ocnița District
Recipients of the Order of the Republic (Moldova)
1965 births